Digna Luz Murillo Moreno (born 22 May 1981 in Carepa, Antioquia, Colombia) is a Colombian-Spanish athlete competing in the sprinting events. She changed allegiance from her native Colombia in 2009. She competed for her original country at the 2000 and 2004 Summer Olympics.

Competition record

Personal bests
Outdoor
100 metres – 11.35 (+0.2 m/s) (Barquisimeto 2003)
200 metres – 22.98 (+1.4 m/s) (Athens 2004)

Indoor
60 metres – 7.31 (Valencia 2011)

References

1981 births
Living people
Colombian female sprinters
Colombian expatriate sportspeople in Spain
Athletes (track and field) at the 2000 Summer Olympics
Athletes (track and field) at the 2004 Summer Olympics
Olympic athletes of Colombia
Athletes (track and field) at the 2003 Pan American Games
Pan American Games competitors for Colombia
Colombian emigrants to Spain
Spanish female sprinters
Sportspeople from Antioquia Department
Central American and Caribbean Games medalists in athletics
Olympic female sprinters
21st-century Colombian women
21st-century Spanish women